Felice Jankell is a Swedish actress. She is known for playing the lead role of "Sophie" in the movie Unga Sophie Bell.

Acting career 
Unga Sophie Bell (Young Sophie Bell) was her feature film debut. She again played the female lead in :sv:Från djupet av mitt hjärta. Swedish newspaper Barometern reported that she will act in the film adaptation of the novel Kalmars jägarinnor written by Tove Folkesson. Currently she has completed the upcoming Swedish horror film "Svart Cirkel" (Black Circle) directed by :es:Adrián García Bogliano.  Felice plays Michael Nyqvists daughter in the "100 Code" .

Nomination 
She was nominated in the best actress category at the Guldbagge Awards in 2016 for "Unga Sophie Bell".

Personal life
Felice is the daughter of Thorsten Flinck and Annika Jankell, and the sister of Happy Jankell. She is of French-Moroccan descent through her paternal grandfather. Jankell and partner, Nils Tham, had a child in November 2019.

References

External links 

Living people
Swedish actresses
Swedish people of French descent
Swedish people of Moroccan descent
Year of birth missing (living people)